The 2010 Turning Point was a professional wrestling pay-per-view event produced by Total Nonstop Action Wrestling (TNA), that  took place on November 7, 2010 at the Impact Zone in Orlando, Florida. It was the seventh event under the Turning Point chronology.

The main event featured Jeff Hardy defending the TNA World Heavyweight Championship against Matt Morgan, which Hardy won following the Twist of Hate. Rob Van Dam versus Tommy Dreamer in a No Disqualification match was also featured on the card. Van Dam defeated Dreamer in the contest. The main bouts on the undercard included Jeff Jarrett versus Samoa Joe, which Jarrett won through making Joe pass out to his signature Rear Naked Choke, and in a Ten Man Tag Team match, Fortune (A.J. Styles, Kazarian, Douglas Williams, Robert Roode, and James Storm) battled EV 2.0 (Raven, Rhino, Sabu, Stevie Richards and Brian Kendrick), where Fortune won after Styles executed the Styles Clash on Sabu from the top rope.

In October 2017, with the launch of the Global Wrestling Network, the event became available to stream on demand.

Storylines

Turning Point featured eight professional wrestling matches that involved different wrestlers from pre-existing scripted feuds and storylines. Wrestlers portrayed villains, heroes, or less distinguishable characters in the scripted events that built tension and culminated in a wrestling match or series of matches.

Results

References

External links
Official Website
TNA Wrestling.com

Impact Wrestling Turning Point
2010 in professional wrestling in Florida
Events in Orlando, Florida
Professional wrestling in Orlando, Florida
November 2010 events in the United States
2010 Total Nonstop Action Wrestling pay-per-view events